Albinism–deafness syndrome  is a condition characterized by congenital neural deafness and a severe or extreme piebald-like phenotype with extensive areas of hypopigmentation.

A locus at Xq26.3-q27.I has been suggested.

It has been suggested that it is a form of Waardenburg syndrome type II.

See also 
 Albinism

References

External links 

Albinism
Disturbances of human pigmentation
Syndromes affecting the skin
Syndromes with sensorineural hearing loss
Rare genetic syndromes